The sixth season of Two and a Half Men began on September 22, 2008, and concluded on May 18, 2009.

Cast

Main
 Charlie Sheen as Charlie Harper
 Jon Cryer as Alan Harper
 Angus T. Jones as Jake Harper
 Marin Hinkle as Judith Harper-Melnick
 Conchata Ferrell as Berta
 Holland Taylor as Evelyn Harper

Recurring
 Jennifer Taylor as Chelsea
 Ryan Stiles as Herb Melnick
 Kelly Stables as Melissa
 Melanie Lynskey as Rose

Guest

 Martin Mull as Russell
 Rena Sofer as Chrissy
 Alicia Witt as Dolores Pasternak
 Michael Clarke Duncan as Jerome Burnett
 Tinashe Kachingwe as Celeste Burnett
 Bellamy Young as Diane
 Jon Polito as Mr. Sharipa
 Emilio Estevez as Andy
 James Earl Jones as himself
 Carol Kane as Shelly
 Iqbal Theba as Don
 Jane Lynch as Dr. Linda Freeman
 Diora Baird as Wanda
 J.D. Walsh as Gordon
 Meagen Fay as Martha
 Joel Murray as Petey
 Emmanuelle Vaugier as Mia

Episodes

Ratings

US Nielsen ratings

Canadian ratings

Notes

References

General references 
 
 
 

Season 6
2008 American television seasons
2009 American television seasons